The Laterns-Gapfohl ski area is a winter sports area in the Austrian municipality of Laterns in Vorarlberg. The ski area stretches across 27 km of slopes.

Geography 
The Laterns-Gapfohl ski area is located in the Laterns Valley in Vorarlberg, a side valley of the Alpine Rhine Valley. It stretches across the south-west and south-east slopes of the Nob, a mountain in the Freschengruppe of the Bregenz Forest Mountains, at an altitude from 1,035 m up to 1,771 m above sea level. 

At the foot of the ski area lies the village of Innerlaterns, which belongs to the municipality of Laterns.

Pistes 
In addition to the seven slopes of different levels of difficulty (easy: 11 km, medium: 12 km, difficult: 4 km) with a total length of 27 km, three ski routes are marked.

There is also a 4 km long natural toboggan run. Furthermore, guided snowshoe hikes and numerous ski tours are offered.

Lifts 
A total of 5 lifts are operated in the Laterns-Gapfohl ski area: a 4-seated chairlift, a 6-seated chairlift, 3 drag lifts and a magic carpet.

Photo gallery

References

External links 

 Official Website of the ski area Laterns-Gapfohl

Vorarlberg
Ski areas in Austria
Sport in Vorarlberg
Sports venues in Austria
Skiing in Austria